Clement Augustine O'Leary (26 June 1916 – 12 June 1969) was a Progressive Conservative party member of the House of Commons of Canada and member of the Senate of Canada. He was born in Lochaber, Nova Scotia whose career was based in the insurance industry.

He was first elected to Parliament at the Antigonish—Guysborough riding in the 1958 general election and served one term, the 24th Parliament, after which he was defeated in the 1962 federal election.

O'Leary was appointed to the Senate on 25 September 1962 under the John Diefenbaker administration and remained a member there until his death in June 1969.

References

External links
 

1916 births
1969 deaths
Members of the House of Commons of Canada from Nova Scotia
Canadian senators from Nova Scotia
Progressive Conservative Party of Canada MPs
Progressive Conservative Party of Canada senators